Cultural properties of Indonesia are those items defined by Indonesian law as of "important value for history, science, and culture", and include both man-made artefacts and natural objects. The cultural properties number more than 8,000 and include ancient Hindu and Buddhist temples, mosques, historic colonial buildings, forts, art galleries, national parks and beaches. A number of the sites are World Heritage Sites.

The current regime for the protection and promotion of the cultural properties of Indonesia is governed by the Act of the Republic of Indonesia No. 5, 1992, concerning Items of Cultural Property. Such measures are to be understood against the background of Section 32 of the 1945 Constitution, according to which "The Government develops the National Culture of Indonesia". Regulation no. 10 of 1993 prescribes the registration of items of cultural property, which is to be undertaken by the relevant second level administrative area. As of 2008, some 8,232 immovable cultural properties and heritage sites have been identified, the last being those places in which items of cultural property are contained.

Legal basis
Cultural properties in Indonesia have been protected since at least 1931, when the colonial government of the Dutch East Indies passed Ordinance Number 19 of 1931 regarding Monuments, which was later amended with another ordinance in 1934. Since 1992, cultural properties have been protected under Act of the Republic of Indonesia Number 5 of 1992 regarding Cultural Properties, which was passed by President Suharto on 21 March. This new law was passed as the old, colonial laws were considered no longer applicable.

Article I of the act defines a cultural property as of "important value for history, science, and culture", being either a man-made object or group of objects, movable (bergerak) or immovable (tidak bergerak), aged at least fifty years which has or have high historical value,; or natural objects with high historical value. Said objects, under Articles IV and V, generally belong to and are under the domain of the national government. However, Article VI allows private ownership under certain conditions. The act then goes on to regulate the search for and discovery of historical objects, as well as their keeping and maintenance.

Under Chapter VII of the act, there are several criminal offences related to cultural properties. The intentional damage, theft, relocation, and/or disfigurement of cultural properties, under Article XXVI, is a felony offence punishable by up to ten years in prison and/or a maximum fine of Rp. 100 million (US$ 10,500). Illegal searches for cultural properties, under Article XVII, is a felony offence which can be punished by up to five years in prison and/or a Rp. 50 million (US$ 5,250) fine. Persons who neglect to maintain cultural objects, as required in Article 10 subsection 1, face a criminal misdemanour charge carrying a maximum of one year in prison and a Rp. 10 million (US$ 1,050) fine.

Indonesia's cultural properties are managed and studied by their respective provincial authorities known as Balai Pelestarian Cagar Budaya (BPCB). The BPCB does not have an official English translation, and usually remains untranslated when referred to in documents in other languages. Nevertheless, BPCB means "Centre for the Conservation of Cultural Properties."

Objects
As of 2008, some 8,232 immovable cultural properties and heritage sites have been identified, the last being those places in which items considered cultural properties are contained. Several examples follow below:

 Borobudur Temple (in Magelang, Central Java
 Bosscha District, in Lembang, West Java
 Cathedral Church, in Jakarta
 Demak Great Mosque, in Demak, Central Java
 Jakarta Art Building, in Jakarta
 Haji Usmar Ismail Cinema Building, in Jakarta
 Kudus Mosque, in Kudus, Central Java
 Kuta Beach District, in Badung, Bali
 Ismail Marzuki Cultural Centre, in Jakarta
 Istiqlal Mosque, in Jakarta
 National Gallery of Indonesia, in Jakarta
 National Monument, in Jakarta
 National Press Monument, in Surakarta
 National Museum, in Jakarta
 Nusa Dua Tourist District, in Nusa Dua, Bali
 Oranje Fortress, in Ternate, North Maluku
 Prambanan Temple Complex, in Klaten, Central Java
 Sam Poo Kong Temple (Kelenteng Sam Poo Kong), in Semarang, Central Java
 Fort Rotterdam, in Makassar, South Sulawesi
 Sumbawa King's Palace, in Sumbawa, West Nusa Tenggara
 Muhammadan Mosque (Masjid Muhammadan), in Padang, West Sumatra
 Maimun Palace (Istana Maimun), in Medan, North Sumatra
 Tjong A Fie Mansion (Rumah Tjong A Fie), in Medan, North Sumatra
 Sri Mariamman Temple (Kuil Sri Mariamman), in Medan, North Sumatra
 Siak Sri Indrapura Palace (Istana Siak Sri Indrapura), in Siak, Riau

See also

 History of Indonesia
 Culture of Indonesia
 List of heritage registers
 List of World Heritage Sites in Indonesia
 List of national parks of Indonesia

References

 
Historic sites in Indonesia
Indonesian culture
Law of Indonesia
Landmarks in Indonesia